Patrol Boat, Riverine, or PBR, is the United States Navy designation for a small rigid-hulled patrol boat used in the Vietnam War from March 1966 until 1975. They were deployed in a force that grew to 250 boats, the most common craft in the River Patrol Force, Task Force 116, and were used to stop and search river traffic in areas such as the Mekong Delta, the Rung Sat Special Zone, the Saigon River and in I Corps, in the area assigned to Task Force Clearwater, in an attempt to disrupt weapons shipments. In this role they frequently became involved in firefights with enemy soldiers on boats and on the shore, were used to insert and extract Navy SEAL teams, and were employed by the United States Army's 458th Transportation Company, known as the 458th Sea Tigers. The PBR was replaced by the Special Operations Craft – Riverine (SOC-R)

Design 
The PBR was a versatile boat with a fiberglass hull and water jet drive which enabled it to operate in shallow, weed-choked rivers. It drew only  of water fully loaded. The drives could be pivoted to reverse direction, turn the boat in its own length, or come to a stop from full speed in a few boat lengths.

The PBR was manufactured in two versions, the first with  length and 10-foot, 7-inch beam.

The PBR was designed by Willis Slane and Jack Hargrave of Hatteras Yachts, located in High Point, NC at the time, and its hull was based on an existing Hatteras Yacht hull. Just seven days after a meeting with US Navy officials, Slane and Hargrave had a prototype ready.

The 11 PBRs delivered in March 1966 and the approximately 300 delivered over the next few years to the U.S. and South Vietnamese military were based on a pleasure boat design constructed by Uniflite, a boatyard in Bellingham, Washington, on the northern end of Puget Sound near the Canadian border.

In October 1965, the Navy awarded a contract to the company for construction of 140 PBRs. The first craft off the assembly line, called the Mark I, was 31 feet long with a hull constructed entirely of fiberglass, a technology developed in the early 1950s.

Crew 
The PBR was usually manned by a four-man crew. Typically, a First Class Petty Officer served as boat captain, with a gunner's mate, an engineman and a seaman on board. Each crewman was cross-trained in each other's jobs in the event one became unable to carry out his duties. Generally, PBRs operated in pairs under the command of a patrol officer who rode on one of the boats.

Power 
The boats were powered by dual  Detroit Diesel 6V53N engines with Jacuzzi Brothers pump-jet drives.

Armament 

The boats have a comparatively heavy firepower for their size.
Typical armament configuration included twin M2HB .50 caliber (12.7 mm) machine guns forward in a rotating shielded tub, a single rear M2HB, one or two M60 7.62 mm light machine guns mounted on the port and starboard sides and a Mk 19 grenade launcher. There was also a full complement of M16 Rifles, shotguns, .45 ACP handguns and hand grenades. Some had a "piggyback" arrangement, a .50 cal machine gun on top of an 81mm mortar; others had a bow-mounted Mk16 Mod 4 Colt 20 mm automatic cannon, derived from the AN/M3 version of the Hispano-Suiza HS.404 and also found on the LCMs and PBRs.

The boats are not well protected, aside from some ceramic armor shielding for the machine gun pit, and some quarter-inch thick steel armor plate for the Coxswain's flat.
They were designed to rely on rapid acceleration, maneuverability, and speed to get out of dangerous situations.

U.S. operations 
From 1966 to 1972 PBRs were operated by the Navy as the principal component of Task Force 116. PBRs were operating with the U.S. Naval Reserve up until 1995 at Mare Island, California, prior to the base's closure due to BRAC action that year. During the Vietnam War, Mare Island was home to the U.S. Navy's Repair Facilities, Mothballing Operations, Submarine Operations, and Riverine Training Operations for both Patrol Craft Inshore (PCF) Swift Boats, PBRs and the River Assault Boats of the Mobile Riverine Force.

The training areas for the PBRs and Swift Boats still exist today within the Napa Sonoma Marsh state wildlife area. Sloughs such as Dutchman Slough, China Slough, Napa Slough, Devil's Slough, Suisun marshland and the Napa River all run through the former training area.

Since the Navy was busy patrolling the rivers, the U.S. Army had to secure the waters around its military ports. So, it converted the 458th Transportation Company (LARC) into a PBR company in early 1968 under the 18th Military Police Brigade. With the company headquarters at Cat Lai, the company assigned pairs of PBRs to each of the Army ports. The crews consisted of two army mariners, coxswain and engineman, and two Military Police as gunners.

In the late 1990s, what remained of the U.S. Navy's PBR force was solely in the Naval Reserve (Swift Boats had been retired from the active duty U.S. Navy immediately following the Vietnam War during the early 1970s), and was moved further inland towards Sacramento, California, the state capital, which is also intertwined with rivers. From Sacramento, PBRs can still transit directly to and through San Francisco Bay and into the Pacific Ocean, if need be. The waters of the State Wildlife Area, next to the former U.S. Navy (Riverine) training base at Mare Island, are still available for U.S. Navy PBR usage.

Operators
  – U.S. Navy
  – Republic of Vietnam Navy
  – Khmer National Navy
  Kingdom of Laos – Royal Lao Navy
  – Royal Thai Navy
  – Brazilian Army
  – SENAN
  – Iraqi Navy
  - Portuguese Navy

Medals 
James "Willie" Williams was a United States Navy sailor commanding PBR 105. During a patrol operation on 31 October 1966, an engagement between two PBRs (105 and one other) and two sampans escalated into a three-hour running battle involving more than 50 enemy vessels, numerous VC ground troops, and US Navy attack helicopter support. For his role in this battle, Williams received the Medal of Honor. According to the citation, "the patrol accounted for the destruction or loss of 65 enemy boats and inflicted numerous casualties on the enemy personnel." Williams is considered the most heavily decorated enlisted sailor in US Navy history. The US Navy posthumously named a guided missile destroyer, USS James E. Williams, after him.

Patrick Osborne Ford was a United States Navy sailor serving on a PBR patrol boat who was killed in South Vietnam after he saved the lives of two of his shipmates. The US Navy posthumously awarded him the Navy Cross and later named a frigate, USS Ford (FFG-54), after him.

In popular culture 

A major part of the action in the 1979 movie Apocalypse Now takes place on a fictional United States Navy PBR by the code name of Street Gang.

An unarmed PBR Mk. II replica called "Boat Machine" or "Du Ma" was used in the "Seamen" special of the television show The Grand Tour by Jeremy Clarkson, who erroneously claimed that as there were no surviving PBRs the replica had to be built completely from scratch and so cost £100,000. Du Ma was as authentic as possible, using the same Jacuzzi drive jets as the original design, but powered by two 350 horsepower V8 petrol engines of unspecified make.

See also
 Fast Patrol Craft: An all-aluminum, riverine boat commonly referred to as the Swift Boat by the U.S. Navy's Brown Water Navy during the Vietnam War.
 Hurricane Aircat: An airboat used as a riverine patrol boat by the U.S. Army during the Vietnam War
 Small unit riverine craft: Small armed and/or armored river craft used to maintain control of rivers and inland waterways.

Notes

Further reading 
 Friedman, Norman. U.S. Small Combatants, Including PT-Boats, Subchasers, and the Brown-Water Navy: An Illustrated Design History. Annapolis, Md.: Naval Institute Press, 1987. .

External links 

 Gamewardens of Vietnam Association, Inc.—The oldest continuously operating Vietnam Veterans Organization in the United States, organized in 1968 by the Veterans of the Vietnam River Patrol Force, primary war boat, the PBR, River Patrol Boat.
 Rivervet website
 PBR Forces Veterans Association
 HNSA Ship Page: PBRs as museums to visit.
 PBR at U.S. Veterans Memorial Museum
 PBR6927

Riverine warfare
Vietnam War ships
Military boats
Patrol vessels of the United States Navy
Patrol boat classes